Marilyn Batista Márquez (born 1959) is a Puerto Rican writer, journalist, and women's rights activist. She is an international lecturer on gender equality and communication issues, and founding director of Revista Petra, a magazine aimed at entrepreneurial, professional, and working women, which promotes visibility of women and self-improvement through education and action. Since 1990, she has resided in Costa Rica.

Biography
Marilyn Batista Márquez was born in Bayamón in 1959. She studied public communication at the University of Puerto Rico, and later earned a master's degree in labor relations at the Interamerican University of Puerto Rico, as well as carrying out postgraduate studies in journalism on military and economic affairs in European countries. She worked as an editor at the newspaper El Nuevo Día, as well as the magazines Comercio & Producción and Panorama Internacional.

In 1990, she moved to Costa Rica to work as a commercial attaché, where she has resided ever since. In 1994, she taught informative journalism at the University of Costa Rica. In 2011, she became the first foreign-born woman to be director of the Costa Rican Chamber of Commerce, and in 2012 she was appointed president of its Program for the Development of Women Entrepreneurs (PDME).

In April 2013, she became director of La Prensa Libre, one of the oldest media outlets in Latin America, holding this position until the end of the newspaper's print edition in 2014.

Literary work 
In 2012, Batista published her first book of short stories, Cuentos de Petra. It and its Italian translation, Racconti di Petra, were presented at the Latin American Festival in Milan that same year.

In 2019, her second book, Sangre de toro, was published. Its stories departed from the erotic theme of Cuentos de Petra to denounce everyday hardships faced by women in different sectors of society.

Recognition
For her support of the arts, in 2000, Batista received an award from the Costa Rican .

In March 2018, the Marilyn Batista Márquez Gallery was inaugurated within the facilities of the Costa Rican Chamber of Commerce, the first such venue in the country dedicated especially to works by women.

In 2019, she received COLPER's Medal for the Defense of Communication, Human Rights, and Culture.

In November 2020, Revista Petra, a digital publication founded by Marilyn Batista in 2005, won the Carmen Cornejo Méndez Award for best alternative media outlet, given annually by COLPER to recognize quality and effort of communicators in Costa Rica.

Works
 Cuentos de Petra (2012), short stories
 Sangre de Toro (2019), short stories

References

External links
 Cuentos de Petra blog 
 Revista Petra 

1959 births
21st-century Puerto Rican women writers
21st-century Puerto Rican writers
Living people
People from Bayamón, Puerto Rico
Puerto Rican expatriates in Costa Rica
Puerto Rican feminists
Puerto Rican journalists
Puerto Rican short story writers
Puerto Rican women short story writers
Academic staff of the University of Costa Rica
University of Puerto Rico alumni